The Goodyear GA-2 Duck was a 1940s American three-seat light amphibious aircraft built by the Goodyear Aircraft Corporation. The design team included David Thurston, who later developed several other light seaplanes including the Colonial Skimmer, Lake Buccaneer, Thurston Teal and Seafire. Only 19 aircraft were built, and these were used only for testing and as demonstrators.

Design and development
The Goodyear Aircraft Corporation began to design a small light amphibian before the end of the Second World War. The prototype designated GA-1 first flew in September 1944. It was a cantilever high-wing monoplane with underwing stabilizing floats. The GA-1 had an all-metal fabric-covered wing, an all-metal single-step hull, and a cruciform tail unit. It had a retractable tail-wheel, accommodation for two, and a pylon-mounted piston engine with a pusher propeller.

Operational history
After successful testing of the prototype, 18 demonstration aircraft were built. These differed from the prototype in that they had room for the pilot and two passengers. Two versions were built, the GA-2 with a  Franklin 6A4-145-A3 piston engine, and the GA-2B with a  Franklin 6A4-165-B3 flat-six piston engine. Although the aircraft were successfully tested and demonstrated, the costs involved in producing the aircraft prevented it being sold at a price that private pilots could afford, and the project was abandoned. In 1950, a revised four-seat variant the GA-22 Drake was flown, followed in 1953 by the GA-22A Drake; only one of each was built.

Variants
GA-1 Duck
Prototype two-seater originally powered by a  Franklin 4ACG-100-H3 piston engine, later fitted with a 125 hp (93 kW) Franklin 6A engine, one built.
GA-2 Duck
Demonstration three-seat aircraft with a  Franklin 6A4-145-A3 engine, 16 built, some later modified as GA-2Bs.
GA-2B Duck
Demonstration three-seat aircraft with a  Franklin 6A4-165-B3 engine, six modified from GA-2s in 1949.
GA-22 Drake
Revised larger variant with four-seats, two built (one as a GA-22A with a revised hull) with the first flight in 1950.
GA-22A Drake
Revised larger variant with four-seats, powered by a  Continental E225-8 and converted into a flying boat with a revised hull; first flight in 1953.

Surviving aircraft

The last aircraft built, the GA-22A Drake registered N5516M, was stored by the EAA Air Venture Museum until 2010. The airplane was transferred to the Military Aviation Preservation Society in Canton, Ohio where it was fully restored and put on display in 2013.

Specifications (GA-2)

See also

References

Further reading

 
 

Duck
1940s United States civil utility aircraft
Single-engined pusher aircraft
High-wing aircraft
Amphibious aircraft
Aircraft first flown in 1944
Flying boats